The Law Terms Act 1830 (11 Geo 4 & 1 Will 4 c 70) was an Act of the Parliament of the United Kingdom that made various changes to the court system of England and Wales.

Section 8 granted direct appeal from the Court of Common Pleas to the Court of Exchequer Chamber, rather than indirectly through the King's Bench.

Section 14 abolished the independent jurisdiction of the courts of session of the County Palatine of Chester.

Section 15 was repealed by section 56 of, and Part IV of Schedule 11 to, the Courts Act 1971.

In a report dated 27 September 1985, the Law Commission and the Scottish Law Commission said that section 32 was the only provision that had not been repealed. They said that local consultation had confirmed it was obsolete and unnecessary. They recommended the whole Act be repealed. The Act was repealed by Group 1 of Part I of Schedule 1 to the Statute Law (Repeals) Act 1986.

References

Bibliography

United Kingdom Acts of Parliament 1830
Acts of the Parliament of the United Kingdom concerning England and Wales
Legal history of England
Constitutional law
Constitution of the United Kingdom